Thomas Albert Jenkins (October 28, 1880 – December 21, 1959) was a member of the Ohio state senate and a long-serving U.S. Representative from Ohio's 10th District (from 1925 to 1959). He was born in Oak Hill, Jackson County, Ohio.

Background 
Jenkins graduated from Providence College, Oak Hill, Ohio, in 1901 and received a law degree from Ohio State University at Columbus in 1907.

Career
Jenkins was admitted to the bar that same year (1907) and commenced practice in Ironton, Ohio. He was prosecuting attorney of Lawrence County, Ohio, from 1916 to 1920. In 1923 and 1924, Jenkins served in the Ohio Senate and was a delegate to the Republican State convention in 1920 and 1924.

Congress 
He was elected as a Republican to the Sixty-ninth and to the sixteen succeeding Congresses (March 4, 1925 – January 3, 1959).  Jenkins was a delegate to Republican National Convention from Ohio in 1940, 1944. In 1947, he served on the Herter Committee.  After the Dunkirk evacuation and during the Battle of Britain Jenkins spoke out in favor of giving aid to the British and campaigned against isolationism.  He had a reputation for being so outspokenly pro-British that in the 1940 election, his opponent, isolationist Democrat John P. Kelso referred to him as the "Congressman from London."  Jenkins responded by calling his opponent a "Craven stooge for Herr Hitler."  In March 1941, he discussed the outcome of the British raid into Norway known as Operation Claymore when news of it played on American news reels, and argued this was proof that Britain could win if only we gave them the help they needed.
   He was not a candidate for renomination in 1958. Jenkins voted in favor of the Civil Rights Act of 1957.

Death 
Jenkins died in 1959 and was interred at Woodland Cemetery, in Ironton, Ohio.

External links

 
 

1880 births
1959 deaths
County district attorneys in Ohio
Republican Party Ohio state senators
Ohio State University Moritz College of Law alumni
People from Oak Hill, Ohio
People from Ironton, Ohio
20th-century American politicians
Republican Party members of the United States House of Representatives from Ohio